The 1973 Oregon State Beavers football team represented Oregon State University in the Pacific-8 Conference (Pac-8) during the 1973 NCAA Division I football season.  In their ninth season under head coach Dee Andros, the Beavers compiled a 2–9 record (2–5 in Pac-8, tie for fifth), and were outscored 293 to 166.  The team played four home games on campus at Parker Stadium in Corvallis, with one at Civic Stadium in Portland.

With their three-point road win over rival Oregon in the season finale, Andros' record improved to 8–1 against the Ducks in the Civil War game.

Schedule

Roster
QB Alvin White

References

Oregon State
Oregon State Beavers football seasons
Oregon State Beavers football